The Khorramshahr, named after the city of Khorramshahr in Iran, is a medium-range ballistic missile that was tested by Iran in January 2017. Its range is between 1,000–2000 km with a 1,800 kg warhead and is 13 m in length.

Overview
Jane's Defence Weekly and Center for Strategic and International Studies stated that it is the Iranian version of North Korea's Hwasong-10. North Korea sold a version of this missile to Iran under the designation BM-25. The number 25 represents the missile range (2500 km). Iran said it has decreased missile size over the initial version, thus reducing propellant mass and range. Such a range covers targets not only in Israel, Egypt and Saudi Arabia, but even NATO members Romania, Bulgaria and Greece, if fired from Western Iran. IRGC Commander of the Aerospace Division, Brigadier General Amir Ali Hajizadeh stated that the Iranian variant “has become smaller in size and more tactical,” which may explain the missile's decreased range. A second theory asserts that Iranian officials do not want to raise concern in Europe about their missile program, and thus are purposely underestimating the range. The IISS's Michael Elleman said that Iran today likely has the capability to go beyond the original range of 1,000-2,000 kilometers with its Khorramshahr ballistic missile, though it chose to limit its range by putting a heavier warhead on it in testing.

Due to the heavy payload, it has potential to carry nuclear warheads, but it is uncertain whether it can carry multiple nuclear warheads due to their size.

The gas output from these rockets, range, warheads and rocket launchers are different. In Khorramshahr missile there is some small separated gas output from the big one in the center to control the missile without wings. The gas output model of the Khorramshahr missile is more like the Hwasong-12.

Brigadier General Amir Ali Hajizadeh, the commander of Aerospace Force of the IRGC, said that Khorramshahr is a missile with multiple-warhead capability.

History
The Khorramshahr was first reportedly test-fired on 29 January 2017, flying about 950 km before exploding and again tested as of August 2020 with a small re-entry vehicle (RV) that extends its range and possibly its accuracy.

See also 
 Military of Iran
 Iranian military industry
 List of military equipment manufactured in Iran
 Iran's missile forces
 Shahab-3
 Equipment of the Iranian Army
 Science and technology in Iran

References

External links

 Khorramshahr missile

Medium-range ballistic missiles of Iran
Surface-to-surface missiles of Iran
Theatre ballistic missiles
Intermediate-range ballistic missiles of Iran
Ministry of Defence and Armed Forces Logistics of the Islamic Republic of Iran